The following highways are numbered 838:

United States